Stevenson College may refer to:

Stevenson College (Edinburgh)
Stevenson College (University of California, Santa Cruz)